In optimization, a self-concordant function  is a function  for which

 

or, equivalently, a function  that, wherever , satisfies

 

and which satisfies  elsewhere.

More generally, a multivariate function  is self-concordant if

 

or, equivalently, if its restriction to any arbitrary line is self-concordant.

History 
As mentioned in the "Bibliography Comments" of their 1994 book, self-concordant functions were introduced in 1988 by Yurii Nesterov and further developed with Arkadi Nemirovski.  As explained in their basic observation was that the Newton method is affine invariant, in the sense that  if for a function  we have Newton steps  then for a function  where  is a non-degenerate linear transformation, starting from  we have the Newton steps  which can be shown recursively

 .

If we suppose that  is 3 times continuously differentiable, then this is equivalent to

 for all 

where  . Then the left hand side of the above inequality is invariant under the affine transformation , however the right hand side is not.

They then arrive at the definition of a self concordant function as

 .

Properties

Linear combination 

Affine transformation 

Convex conjugate 
If  is self-concordant, then its convex conjugate  is also self-concordant.

Non-singular Hessian 
If  is self-concordant and the domain of  contains no straight line (infinite in both directions), then  is non-singular.

We note also that  cannot have a minimum inside its domain.

Applications 
Among other things, self-concordant functions are useful in the analysis of Newton's method. Self-concordant barrier functions are used to develop the barrier functions used in interior point methods for convex and nonlinear optimization.

Self-concordant barrier functions

 are a class of functions that can be used as barriers in constrained optimization methods
 can be minimized using the Newton algorithm with provable convergence properties analogous to the usual case (but these results are somewhat more difficult to derive)
 to have both of the above, the usual constant bound on the third derivative of the function (required to get the usual convergence results for the Newton method) is replaced by a bound relative to the Hessian

Minimizing a self-concordant function 
A self-concordant function may be minimized with a modified Newton method where we have a bound on the number of steps required for convergence.  We suppose here that  is a standard self-concordant function, that is it is self-concordant with parameter .

 
We further have
 

Then if we have
 
then it is also guaranteed that , so that we can continue to use the Newton method until convergence. If  then
 
 
with the following definitions
 
 
 

Examples

Self-concordant functions 

 Linear and convex quadratic functions are self-concordant with  since their third derivative is zero.
Some examples are
 for 
 
  for 
 
 for any function  satisfying the conditions, the function  with  also satisfies the conditions

Functions that are not self-concordant

Self-concordant barriers 

 positive orthant :  with 
 the logarithmic barrier  for the quadratic region defined by  where  where  is a positive semi-definite symmetric matrix self-concordant for 
 second order cone : 
 semi-definite cone : 
 exponential cone : 
 power cone :

References 

Functions and mappings